Gil Z. Hochberg is the Ransford Professor of Hebrew and Visual Studies, Comparative Literature, and Middle East Studies at Columbia University. She has written two academic books. Visual Occupations: Vision and Visibility in a Conflict Zone (2015) examines the politics of visibility in Palestine/Israel through film, art and photography. Her first book, In Spite of Partition: Jews, Arabs and the Limits of Separatist Imagination (2007), focuses on literary works that complicate binary formulations of identity in Palestine/Israel and that foreground complex and fraught histories in common. She previously taught for 15 years at UCLA

Her statements on Israel were criticized by Karys Rhea in The Tower (magazine).

Bibliography 
 In Spite of Partition: Jews, Arabs, and the Limits of Separatist Imagination (Princeton University Press, 2007)
 Visual Occupations: Vision and Visibility in a Conflict Zone (Duke University Press, 2015)

References 

Year of birth missing (living people)
Living people
Columbia University faculty